Ruben Josefson (25 August 1907 – 19 March 1972) was a Swedish bishop within the Church of Sweden. 

He enrolled at Uppsala University in 1926, became a graduate of theology there in 1931, theology licentiate in 1935 and doctor of theology in 1937.
Josefson was ordained priest in 1940. He was appointed as Bishop of the Diocese of Härnösand in 1958 and served in this position until 1967 when he was appointed Archbishop of Uppsala. He was Archbishop until his death in 1972.

References

Other sources
Hansson, Klas (2014)  Svenska kyrkans primas: Ärkebiskopsämbetet i förändring 1914–1990 (Uppsala: Acta Universitatis Upsaliensi) 

1907 births
1972 deaths
People from Svenljunga Municipality
Uppsala University alumni
Lutheran archbishops of Uppsala
Bishops of Härnösand
Burials at Uppsala old cemetery